1,3,5-Triheptylbenzene (also called sym-triheptylbenzene) is an aromatic organic compound with a chemical formula  and molar mass 372.67 g/mol. It can be prepared by the hydrogenation reduction reaction of 1,1',1''-(benzene-1,3,5-triyl)tris(heptan-1-one). Alternatively, 1-nonyne trimerizes to 1,3,5-triheptylbenzene when catalyzed by rhodium trichloride.

References

Alkylbenzenes